Kremenik is a small dispersed settlement in the hills south of Poljane nad Škofjo Loko in the Municipality of Gorenja Vas–Poljane in the Upper Carniola region of Slovenia.

References

External links

Kremenik on Geopedia

Populated places in the Municipality of Gorenja vas-Poljane